Trška Gora is a settlement on Mount Trška Gora north of Novo Mesto in southeastern Slovenia. The area is part of the traditional region of Lower Carniola and is now included in the Southeast Slovenia Statistical Region.

The local church, built on top of Mount Trška Gora in the northern part of the settlement, is dedicated to the Nativity of Mary and belongs to the Parish of Šentpeter–Otočec. It was built in 1621 on the site of an earlier church. Two of the paintings in the church are the work of Josip Egartner.

Shortly after the church was built, four linden trees were planted beside it. The largest one's trunk measures  in circumference, making it the linden tree with the largest girth in Lower Carniola. The linden trees are nearly 400 years old.

References

External links
Trška Gora on Geopedia
Trška Gora, Facebook page

Populated places in the City Municipality of Novo Mesto